The domain name .com is a top-level domain (TLD) in the Domain Name System (DNS) of the Internet. Added at the beginning of 1985, its name is derived from the word commercial, indicating its original intended purpose for domains registered by commercial organizations. Later, the domain opened for general purposes.

The domain was originally administered by the United States Department of Defense, but is today operated by Verisign, and remains under ultimate jurisdiction of U.S. law. Verisign registrations in the .com domain are processed via registrars accredited by ICANN. The registry accepts internationalized domain names.

The domain was one of the original top-level domains (TLDs) on the Internet when the Domain Name System was implemented in January 1985, the others being edu, gov, mil, net, org, and int. It has grown into the largest top-level domain, and has lent its name to an era in the late 1990s, the dot-com bubble, during which excessive speculation in Internet-related companies in a period of rapid growth in the use and adoption of the Internet led to a stock market bubble and crash.

History

The domain .com was one of the first set of top-level domains when the Domain Name System was first implemented for use on the Internet on January 1, 1985. The domain was administered by the U.S. Department of Defense, however, the department contracted the domain maintenance to SRI International. SRI created DDN-NIC, also known as SRI-NIC, or simply the NIC (Network Information Center), then accessible online with the domain name nic.ddn.mil. Beginning October 1, 1991, an operations contract was awarded to Government Systems Inc. (GSI), which sub-contracted it to Network Solutions Inc. (NSI).

On January 1, 1993, the National Science Foundation assumed responsibility of maintenance, as com was primarily being used for non-defense interests. The NSF contracted operation to Network Solutions (NSI). In 1995, the NSF authorized NSI to begin charging registrants an annual fee for the first time since the domain's inception. Initially, the fee was US$50 per year, with US$35 going to NSI, and US$15 going to a government fund. New registrations had to pay for the first two years, making the new-domain registration fee US$100. In 1997, the United States Department of Commerce assumed authority over all generic TLDs. It is currently operated by Verisign, which had acquired Network Solutions. Verisign later spun off Network Solutions' non-registry functions into a separate company that continues as a registrar. In the English language, the domain is often spelled with a leading period and commonly pronounced as dot-com, and has entered common parlance this way.

Although com domains were initially intended to designate commercial entities, the domain has had no restrictions for eligible registrants since the mid-1990s. With the commercialization and popularization of the Internet, the domain was opened to the public and quickly became the most common top-level domain for websites, email, and networking. Many companies that flourished in the period from 1997 to 2001—the time known as the "dot-com bubble"—incorporated the label com into company names; these became known as dot-coms or dot-com companies. The introduction of biz in 2001, which is restricted to businesses, has had no impact on the popularity of com.

Although companies anywhere in the world can register com domains, many countries have a second-level domain with a similar purpose under their own country code top-level domain (ccTLD), such as Australia (com.au), China (com.cn), Greece (com.gr), Israel (co.il), India (co.in), Indonesia (co.id), Japan (co.jp), Mexico (com.mx), Nepal (.com.np), South Korea (co.kr), Sri Lanka (com.lk), United Kingdom (co.uk), and Vietnam (.com.vn).

Many non-commercial sites and networks use com names to benefit from the perceived recognizability of a com domain. However, the registration statistics show varying popularity over the years.

In December 2011, Verisign reported that approximately 100 million com domains were registered. According to the Domain Name Industry Brief published in March 2020, which publishes every quarter, com domain registration totaled 145.4 million. As of March 2009, Verisign reported that 926 accredited registrars serve the domain.

On November 29, 2012, the U.S. Department of Commerce approved the renewal of the com Registry Agreement between Verisign, Inc., and ICANN. Through this agreement, Verisign managed the com registry until November 30, 2018.

List of oldest second-level domains
The following are the 100 oldest still-existing registered com domains.

See also
 
 List of most expensive domain names

References

External links
 IANA .com whois information
 List of .com accredited registrars
 .com WhoIS
 .com Registry Agreement at ICANN

Generic top-level domains
Council of European National Top Level Domain Registries members
Computer-related introductions in 1985
Internet properties established in 1985
1985 establishments in the United States